Ras-associating and dilute domain-containing protein is a protein that in humans is encoded by the RADIL gene.

References

Further reading